The Aprilia Tuono is a naked motorcycle manufactured by Aprilia from 2002. It is based on the Aprilia RSV Mille. Its successor, the Aprilia RSV1000R superbike  shares its engine, gearbox, frame and, partly, its suspension. The Tuono was succeeded by the Aprilia Tuono V4 R for model year 2011, though the V2 model continued in production into the 2011 model year.

Design 
The current Aprilia Tuono is designed as a streetfighter with a lot of electronic aids such as multi level traction control, ABS, Wheelie control, launch control and AQS(Aprilia Quick Shift electronic System). Since 2002, a lot of changes have been made but the basic character of the bike almost remains the same.

2002 Aprilia Tuono R Limited
Following the 2001 Bologna Motor Show, the Aprilia Tuono made its debut in a series of 220 individually numbered bikes. Called the Tuono R Limited and in hindsight being a proof of concept for the future RSV Tuono Factory, it had the  engine of the RSV Mille R, a gold colored frame and was built solely out of high end materials such as carbon fiber, kevlar and titanium. Specs included Öhlins Racing suspension, OZ forged alloy wheels, Brembo 4-pad brake calipers and an Aprilia Racing titanium exhaust system with matching EEPROM.

2002 - 2005 RSV Tuono (known as the Tuono Fighter for 2003 in the US market)
The roots of the RSV Tuono lie with the 1998 - 2003 RSV Mille superbike. The original 2003-2005 RSV Tuono uses the 2002 Mille frame, engine, suspension and brakes. The majority of parts are interchangeable between Mille and Tuono models up until the introduction of the RSV 1000 R which replaced the Mille. One minor difference is that the RSV Tuono is fitted with a steering damper as standard whereas the RSV Mille is not. The reason for this is to avoid potential speed wobble under full acceleration due to the motocross style handlebars atop high machined ergal risers causing the rider to sit more upright, resulting in less weight over the front wheel. The main difference is the lack of significant bodywork (fairings). 

The base model Tuono (known as the Tuono Fighter in the US market for 2003 and as the RSV Tuono for the 2004-2005 models) and the high spec Tuono Factory all share the same frame-mounted bikini fairing and body covers, either in plastic for the base model or carbon fibre for the Factory models. The frame and swingarm of the 2003 Tuono (Tuono Fighter in the US market) was a light bronze color, whereas the 2004 and 2005 models sported a black frame and swingarm. This contrasted with the frames used on the RSV Mille which were a chrome finish for the base models and black for the Racing/Factory models. The Tuono base models feature an adjustable Sachs rear shock absorber and Showa front suspension.

The RSV Tuono uses the Austrian built BRP-Rotax V990 60° V-Twin engine which can also be found in numerous other Aprilia models. It sports dual overhead cams, double balance shafts, 4 valves per cylinder, electronic fuel injection, twin spark ignition and the same two-into-one exhaust as used on the RSV Mille. In the RSV Tuono, the V990 delivers  @ 9500 rpm and  @ 7250 rpm.  Its fuel tank will hold 18 L (4.8 gal) and has a maximum range of 280 km (175 mi) on the highway before the low fuel indicator turns on.  Fuel consumption increases significantly with aggressive throttle use.

2003 - 2005 RSV Tuono Factory
The RSV Tuono Factory is a high spec model based upon the Aprilia RSV Mille R. Compared to the standard RSV Tuono it has forged alloy wheels, gold anodized Öhlins Racing front forks, fully adjustable Öhlins Racing rear monoshock, a fully adjustable Öhlins Racing steering damper, radially mounted Brembo brake calipers and it extensively uses carbon fiber parts for weight reduction.

2006 - 2010 Tuono 1000 R

The 2nd generation Tuono, the Tuono 1000 R, is based upon the 2004 - 2009 Aprilia RSV1000R superbike. One technical difference between the Tuono 1000 R and the RSV1000R is that the latter has a rear shock with adjustable compression and rebound damping, as well as adjustable preload. The Tuono 1000 R only has adjustable preload and rebound damping. This makes the stock Tuono somewhat less usable as a track bike than the Mille. However, since the parts between the two are interchangeable and abundant this should not hinder anyone wanting to use the Tuono as a track bike from changing the rear shock.

Other differences are purely cosmetic and consist of the lack of a full fairing, a superbike handlebar instead of clip-ons and different paint schemes. Like the first generation Tuono, the Tuono 1000 R also employs a steering damper as standard.

The BRP-Rotax V990 60° V-Twin engine was upgraded significantly when compared to the first generation Tuono: different gear ratios (close ratio with longer first gear), larger throttle bodies, single spark plug, minor cosmetic changes and an increase in power output to  @ 9500 rpm. Torque increased to  @ 8500 rpm.

The 2006 - 2010 Aprilia Tuono is offered in two versions: the Tuono 1000 R is the standard version, based upon the Aprilia RSV1000R. The Tuono 1000 R Factory is Aprilia's flagship naked bike.

2006 - 2010 Tuono 1000 R Factory

The Tuono 1000 R Factory comes with fully adjustable Öhlins Racing rear mono-shock and front forks, blue- or gold-anodized (depending on model year) forged aluminum wheels, a frame finished in gold, a paint job sporting the signature Aprilia Lion's head on the fuel tank and the extensive use of carbon fiber parts.

2012 - Tuono V4 APRC
For the 2012 model year, the Tuono was completely redesigned along the lines of the RSV4 with a 1000cc 65° V4. As with that bike, it received Aprilia's APRC (Aprilia Performance Ride Control) package with 8-position traction control, 3 position wheelie control, and 3 position launch control.
For the 2014 model year, various refinements including a larger 18.5 L fuel tank, more comfortable saddle, and 3 position race ABS brakes were introduced. It produced 153.6 horsepower and 77.1 foot pounds of torque at the rear wheel in dyno testing. It was generally well received with one complaint centering on driveline lash due to the use of a slipper clutch.

2015 - Tuono V4 1100
Tuono comes with three levels of adjustable ABS system developed in collaboration with Bosch, plus three new engine maps—Sport, Track, and Race.

The new 2017 Tuonos are outfitted with Aprilia’s new TFT display and produces  @ 11,000 rpm (claimed). The Tuonos were also available in the factory paint scheme similar to that on the Aprilia RS V4.

References

External links 
 Motorcycle.com 2006 Aprilia Tuono 1000 R review 

Tuono
Standard motorcycles
Motorcycles introduced in 2002